At the 1989 Jeux de la Francophonie, the athletics events were held in Casablanca, Morocco between 12 and 17 July 1989.

Medal summary

Men

Women

Medal table

References
 GBRathletics
 Results

1989
Francophonie
Athletics